Mynydd y Cwm is a hill in the Clwydian Range in Denbighshire, North Wales. It reaches a height of 304.8 metres (1,000 feet). It has recently been promoted to Marilyn status having a prominence of 150 metres.

At the summit there is a memorial to the crew of a Handley Page Halifax that crashed on the hill in 1947.

References

Marilyns of Wales
Mountains and hills of Denbighshire